"The Lady Is a Tramp" is a show tune from the 1937 Rodgers and Hart musical Babes in Arms, in which it was introduced by former child star Mitzi Green. This song is a spoof of New York high society and its strict etiquette (the first line of the verse is "I get too hungry for dinner at eight...") and phony social pretensions. It has become a popular music standard.

The song appears in the film version of Babes in Arms (1939) as an instrumental version only.

Recordings
Early recordings from 1937 include one by Tommy Dorsey and His Orchestra (featuring Edythe Wright on vocals), Midge Williams and Her Jazz Jesters, Sophie Tucker, and Bernie Cummins on the Vocalion records label (#3714). Lena Horne recorded the song with the Metro-Goldwyn-Mayer Studio Orchestra on March 30, 1948. Her performance appeared in the film Words and Music, a fictionalized biography of the partnership of Rodgers and Hart.

The song was also used in the film version of Pal Joey starring Frank Sinatra and Rita Hayworth. Joey Evans (Sinatra) sings the song to Vera Simpson (Hayworth) as he tries to entice the wealthy widow Simpson into financing Evans's dream of owning his own night club.

It was recorded by Frank Sinatra, Ella Fitzgerald, Buddy Greco (whose version updates the lyrics to include several 1950s pop-culture references), Bing Crosby (for his radio shows) and Pat Suzuki in the 1950s, and Shirley Bassey in the 1960s, becoming a signature song for Sinatra. He sang the song with new lyrics as "The Gentleman Is a Champ" at tribute events for Spiro Agnew and Orson Welles, also recording a new version under the pseudonym Frankie Alvert titled "Maureen Is a Champ" for Ringo Starr's wife Maureen Starkey; never commercially released.

Tony Bennett and Lady Gaga duet

Tony Bennett and Lady Gaga recorded a version of this song for his 2011 album Duets II. Bennett praised Gaga's performance in the song, saying that she is a real "jazz lady". They performed the song on ABC's Thanksgiving special dedicated to, written, directed, produced and hosted by Gaga, entitled A Very Gaga Thanksgiving. They were the opening number, singing next to an old piano in a casual obscure room. Bennett said, "I see in Lady Gaga a touch of theatrical genius, she is very creative and very productive, I think as time goes on she might be America's Picasso. I think she's going to become as big as Elvis Presley." The song, even though not officially released, got to enter the Japan Hot 100 chart, where it managed to reach the top 40. It also entered the top 200 extension to the UK Singles Chart.

Following the single, Bennett drew a sketch of Gaga naked for the January 2012 issue of Vanity Fair, which was then auctioned for $30,000. The money raised went to charity, supporting the Exploring the Arts (ETA) and Born This Way Foundation.

The song as well as its music video received critical acclaim for both Bennett and Gaga's vocals as well as for the simplicity of the video, which departed from Gaga's previous efforts. The song received praise from both E! and MTV. Other critics expressed hopes that Gaga would release her own jazz music after this successful effort.

Music video
The duo filmed a music video for the track. The video shows Bennett and Gaga singing "The Lady Is a Tramp" together in a studio in front of music stands. The video received a largely positive critical reception.

Charts

Release history

In popular culture
The 1955 Disney animated classic Lady and the Tramp is a play off the song's name.
A 1974 TV commercial for the Chrysler Plymouth Scamp car featured a song parody of "The Lady Is a Tramp": 'That's why this lady drives a Scamp.'
An early Channel 4 sitcom that ran between 1983-4, that starred Patricia Hayes and Pat Coombs as a pair of tramps who liven in a broken down car.
The 1997 Spice Girls song "The Lady Is A Vamp" is a play off the song title "The Lady Is a Tramp."
In the eighteenth episode of the first season of Glee, "Laryngitis", Noah Puckerman (Mark Salling) performs the song as a duet with Mercedes Jones (Amber Riley).
Carol-Lynne performs the song in the third episode of The Playboy Club.
They Might Be Giants recorded an instrumental track that interpreted the song

See also
 Lady and the Tramp, a later, animated, feature film targeted for children

References

Songs with music by Richard Rodgers
Songs with lyrics by Lorenz Hart
Ella Fitzgerald songs
Tony Bennett songs
1937 songs
Sophie Tucker songs
Frank Sinatra songs
Songs from Babes in Arms
Lena Horne songs
They Might Be Giants songs
Lady Gaga songs
Songs from Pal Joey (film)